Scott Evans may refer to:

Scott Evans (actor) (born 1983), American actor
Scott Evans (badminton) (born 1987), Irish badminton player
Scott Evans (Canadian football) (born 1983), Canadian football player
Scott Evans (lacrosse) (born 1981), Canadian lacrosse player
Scott K. Evans (born 1965), American politician and former mayor of Atlantic City, New Jersey
Scott Evans (host) (born 1986), American television personality, Access Hollywood correspondent
Scott Evans (Arrowverse), a character from The Flash

See also
De Scott Evans (1847–1898), American artist
 List of people with surname Evans